Anekes paucistriata is a species of sea snail, a marine gastropod mollusk, unranked in the superfamily Seguenzioidea.

Description
The size of the shell varies between 1 mm and 1.5 mm.

Distribution
This species occurs in the Atlantic Ocean on the Gorringe Ridge and off Madeira; in the Mediterranean Sea.

References

 Gofas, S.; Le Renard, J.; Bouchet, P. (2001). Mollusca, in: Costello, M.J. et al. (Ed.) (2001). European register of marine species: a check-list of the marine species in Europe and a bibliography of guides to their identification. Collection Patrimoines Naturels, 50: pp. 180–213

External links
  Serge GOFAS, Ángel A. LUQUE, Joan Daniel OLIVER,José TEMPLADO & Alberto SERRA (2021) - The Mollusca of Galicia Bank (NE Atlantic Ocean); European Journal of Taxonomy 785: 1–114
 

paucistriata
Gastropods described in 1992